The 1992–93 Calgary Flames season was the 13th National Hockey League season in Calgary.  The Flames rebounded from their disappointing 1991–92 season, finishing 2nd in the Smythe Division, four points behind the Vancouver Canucks.

The Flames met the Los Angeles Kings in the Smythe Division semi-finals. The series was an offensive showdown, with the Flames setting team records for most goals scored in a six-game series (28) and most goals against (33).  The Flames once again failed to win a playoff series, falling in six games.

Two Flames represented the Campbell Conference at the 1993 All-Star Game: Forward Gary Roberts and goaltender Mike Vernon.

On February 10, 1993, the Flames set numerous franchise and league records in a 13–1 victory over the San Jose Sharks. In addition to being a team record for goals scored at 13, the score also represents the largest margin of victory in team history (12).   Calgary set a new team mark for fastest four goals scored (1:21).  Jeff Reese set an NHL record for points in one game by a goaltender with 3 assists, while Theoren Fleury set a league record by going +9 in this game.  All of these records remain today.

Four Flames (Theoren Fleury, Joe Nieuwendyk, Robert Reichel and Gary Roberts) reached the 30-goal plateau.

Prior to the season, the Flames lost two players in the 1992 NHL Expansion Draft, as Left Winger Chris Lindberg was selected by the Ottawa Senators 35th overall, and forward Tim Hunter went to the Tampa Bay Lightning 42nd overall.

Regular season

Season standings

Schedule and results

Playoffs

Player statistics

Skaters
Note: GP = Games played; G = Goals; A = Assists; Pts = Points; PIM = Penalty minutes

†Denotes player spent time with another team before joining Calgary.  Stats reflect time with the Flames only.

Goaltenders
Note: GP = Games played; TOI = Time on ice (minutes); W = Wins; L = Losses; OT = Overtime/shootout losses; GA = Goals against; SO = Shutouts; GAA = Goals against average

†Denotes player spent time with another team before joining Calgary.  Stats reflect time with the Flames only.

Transactions
The Flames were involved in the following transactions during the 1992–93 season.

Trades

Free agents

Signings

Waivers

Draft picks

Calgary's picks at the 1992 NHL Entry Draft, held in Montreal, Quebec.

See also
1992–93 NHL season

References
Player stats: 2006–07 Calgary Flames Media Guide, pg 119
Game log: 2006–07 Calgary Flames Media Guide, pg 137
Team standings:  1992–93 NHL standings @hockeydb.com
Trades:

Calgary Flames seasons
Calgary Flames season, 1992-93
Calg